Edward Burton FRS FLS (1790 – 11 March 1867) was a British Army surgeon and a zoologist. He was also a magistrate for Kent.

Life

Little is known of Burton's life. He may have studied at St. George's Hospital, London. The earliest record of his military career is in 1813, when he was attached to the 12th Foot, and was promoted from Hospital-Mate to Assistant-Surgeon. In 1818, he transferred between units. In 1826, he was attached to the 9th Light Dragoons, and was promoted Surgeon to the Forces. In 1837, he retired on half-pay.

Burton was stationed at Fort Pitt, Chatham from 1829 to 1837. In 1838, he compiled A Catalogue of the Collection of Mammalia and Birds in the Museum of the Army Medical Department at Fort Pitt, Chatham. He wrote in its Preface, "This task has been undertaken at such broken and uncertain periods as his professional duties left at the disposal of its author".

He described several species of bird, for some of which he is the valid binomial authority.

Burton may have been the author of an 1821 paper relating to Pelecanus aquilus Linn. on Ascension Island. He has been identified as the man who in 1835 displayed a specimen of a species of Ratelus  at the Zoological Society of London. He has also been identified as the man who in 1836 communicated a description of Pipra squalida, a Himalayan flowerpecker, to the Zoological Society.

Legacy

Three species have been named in Burton's honour: a bird, the spectacled finch (Callacanthis burtoni ); and two lizards, Burton's legless lizard (Lialis burtonis) and Burton's nessia (Nessia burtonii ). A fourth species may have been named in his honour: a mammal, Burton's gerbil (Gerbillus burtoni ).

Notes

References

1790 births
1867 deaths
Date of birth missing
19th-century British zoologists
British ornithologists
19th-century British Army personnel
Fellows of the Royal Society
Fellows of the Linnean Society of London
British Army regimental surgeons
People from Kent